Elections to Gosport Borough Council are currently taking place as of 5 May 2022 as part of the 2022 United Kingdom local elections.

The Liberal Democrats gained control of the council from the Conservative Party.

Background 
The whole council was up for election following a boundary review. This reduced the size the council from 34 to 28.

The seats up had previously been elected in 2018 and 2021. The elections in 2018, saw the Liberal Democrats gain four seats: two from Conservatives, and one each from the Labour and UKIP. The Conservatives however gained the sole UKIP seat, retaining their majority on the council. The other half of seats were elected in 2021, when the Conservatives gained one seat from Labour. This left the council with a Conservative majority of four.

Summary

Election result

|}

Ward results

Alverstoke

Anglesey

Bridgemary

Brockhurst and Privett

Elson

Forton

Grange and Alver Valley

Harbourside and Town

Hardway

Leesland and Newtown

Lee East

Lee West

Peel Common

Rowner and Holbrook

References 

Gosport
2020s in Hampshire
2022